Indianapolis, Oklahoma is a former unincorporated community in Custer County, Oklahoma.

History
Originally a settlement set directly off a railroad, Indianapolis was inhabited from the 1800s to the late 1900s.

Climate

References

Geography of Custer County, Oklahoma
Former populated places in Oklahoma